Hardass, Hard Ass, or Hard-Ass may refer to:
 Hardas or Hardass, a village in Kargil district, Ladakh, India
 Hard Ass, a book-length poem by Sharon McCartney that was nominated for a ReLit Award
"Hard Ass", a 2001 episode of Titus
"Hard Ass", a 1995 song by Money Mark from Mark's Keyboard Repair
 Hard-Ass, a character in Last Man Standing
 Officer Hardass, a character in Drugwars

See also
 Buttocks
 Hard Ass Candy, an art collection by Olinda Castielle
 Hard Ass Sessions, a series of compilation albums from Enchufada